Alexandre Trubine (born 8 June 1966) is a Russian racing cyclist. He rode in the 1990 Tour de France.

References

1966 births
Living people
Russian male cyclists
Place of birth missing (living people)